Guy Elmes (22 July 1920- December 1998) was a British screenwriter.

Select filmography
Behold the Man (1949) - TV movie
The Planter's Wife (1952)
Counterspy (1953)
The Flanagan Boy (1953)
Wheel of Fate (1953)
The Stranger's Hand (1954)
Bang! You're Dead (1954)
Across the Bridge (1957)
Nor the Moon by Night (1958)
Serious Charge (1959)
Mission in Morocco (1959)
London Calling (1960) (documentary)
Pontius Pilate (1962)
The Captive City (1962)
 Stranglehold (1963)
Submarine X-1 (1968)
The Invincible Six (1970)
The Night Visitor (1971)
White Fang (1973)
The Red Hand Gang (1977) - TV series
A Nightingale Sang in Berkley Square (1979)

References

External links

1920 births
1998 deaths
20th-century British screenwriters